Wolfgang Dehnel is a German politician of the Christian Democratic Union (CDU). He was a member of the Volkskammer and of the Bundestag.

Life 
Dehnel joined the GDR CDU in 1976 and was a city councillor in Schwarzenberg from 1980 to 1990. From 1990 to 1997 he was chairman of the Schwarzenberg CDU district association. He was elected to the Volkskammer in 1990 for constituency 08 (Karl-Marx-Stadt), of which he was a member from 18 March to 2 October 1990. After reunification, he became a member of the Bundestag, to which he belonged until 2002 as a directly elected member of parliament for constituency 326 (Aue-Schwarzenberg-Klingenthal). From 2005 to 2015 Dehnel was chairman of the Erzgebirgszweigverein Schwarzenberg.

References

External links 

1945 births
Living people
Members of the Bundestag for Saxony
Members of the Bundestag 1998–2002
Members of the Bundestag 1994–1998
Members of the Bundestag 1990–1994
Members of the Bundestag 1987–1990
Members of the Bundestag for the Christian Democratic Union of Germany
Members of the 10th Volkskammer